PTEN may mean:

 Prime Time Entertainment Network
 PTEN (gene), a human tumour suppressor gene on chromosome 10 (and its protein: phosphatase and tensin homolog)

See also 
 Akt/PKB signaling pathway
 Discovery and development of mTOR inhibitors
 PI3K/AKT/mTOR pathway
 Akt inhibitor